Frederick Morton Sharp (January 22, 1911 – October 18, 2002) was a Canadian politician. He served in the Legislative Assembly of British Columbia from 1957 to 1960  from the electoral district of Vancouver East, a member of the Social Credit Party.

References

1911 births
2002 deaths
British Columbia Social Credit Party MLAs
Politicians from Vancouver